The Principality of Leiningen was a short-lived principality ruled by the Prince of Leiningen.

History

The principality emerged in 1803 in the course of secularization and was created when the princely branch of the House of Leiningen, which had been raised to the rank of a Prince of the Holy Roman Empire in 1779, was deprived of its lands on the left bank of the Rhine by France, namely at Dagsburg, Hardenburg and Dürkheim, and subsequently received the secularized Amorbach Abbey as an ample compensation in 1803.

A few years later, the Principality of Leiningen was mediatized in 1806. Its territory is now included mainly in Baden-Württemberg, but partly in Bavaria and in Hesse. Amorbach Abbey is still today the family seat of the Prince of Leiningen.

References

Bibliography 
 Laurenz Hannibal Fischer:  Die Verwaltungsverhältnisse des fürstlichen Hauses Leiningen, Amorbach 1828.
 Eva Kell: Das Fürstentum Leiningen. Umbruchserfahrungen einer Adelsherrschaft zur Zeit der Französischen Revolution. Kaiserslautern 1993.
 Sandra Schwab: Die Entschädigung des Hauses Leiningen durch den Reichsdeputationshauptschluß von 1803, Studienarbeit. GRIN Verlag für akademische Texte, BoD. Norderstedt 2007.
 Ingo Toussaint: Die Grafen von Leiningen: Studien zur leiningischen Genealogie und Territorialgeschichte bis zur Teilung von 1317/18. J. Thorbecke Verlag, 1982.



Principality of Leiningen
Principalities of the Holy Roman Empire